Undead 13+2 is the first studio album released by Japanese rock band Sadie,  released on June 25, 2008 in Japan. The songs are re-recordings of old Sadie tracks. Many of the original tracks are only obtainable through resale. The limited edition includes a DVD with Sadie's music videos, with the video for "A Holy Terrors" being recorded exclusively for this release.

Track listing
Disc one
 "Obstacle Progress" – 2:51
 "Meisai" (迷彩) – 5:03
 "Mad-Roid" – 3:48
 "Confusion" – 3:23
 "Under the Chaos" – 4:11
 "Children of Despair" – 3:48
 "Silent Eve" (サイレントイヴ) – 4:50
 "Psycho Culture" (サイコカルチャー) – 4:08
 "Grudge of Sorrow" – 4:08
 "M.F.P(Malicious Female Pigs)" – 3:34
 "Mousou hi Gyaku Seiheiki" (妄想被虐性癖) – 4:16
 "A Holy Terrors" – 4:01
 "Empty Room" – 4:23
 "Barking the Enemy" – 3:29
 "Sayonara no Hate" (サヨナラの果て) – 5:41
Disc two (DVD, Limited edition only)
 "Meisai" (迷彩)
 "A Holy Terrors"
 "Silent Eve" (サイレントイヴ)
 "Crimson Tear"

2008 albums
Sadie (band) albums